The Volunteer Force was a British part-time citizen army extant from 1859–1908.

Volunteer force may also refer to:

 British Volunteer Corps, 1794–1803
 Isle of Man Volunteers, 1860s–1920
 Volunteer Force (New Zealand), 1865–1910
 Volunteer Training Corps, 1914–1918
 Sri Lanka Army Volunteer Force, formed 1949

See also
 Volunteer military